St Mary's College is a college of Durham University in England. Following the grant of a supplemental charter in 1895 allowing women to receive degrees of the university, St Mary's was founded as the Women's Hostel in 1899, adopting its present name in May 1920.

In 1952, the college moved from the Bailey, adjacent to Durham Cathedral, to new buildings on Elvet Hill to the South of the city, becoming the first of Durham's "hill colleges".

In 2005, the college changed from a women's college to a mixed one, the last of Durham's colleges to do so.

History

Founding

St Mary's first home was at 33 Claypath with six students, before moving into Abbey House on Palace Green, then to 9 The College behind Durham Cathedral, which is now occupied by the Chorister School.

In 1952, it moved to a new site on Elvet Hill, becoming the first of the "hill colleges". The foundation stone for the new building, now known as the Fergusson Building, was laid in 1947 by Princess Elizabeth (later Queen Elizabeth II). St Mary's is the only one of the hill colleges to have been founded in the 19th century.

Change to a mixed college
For several decades there had been debates about St Mary’s continuing as a single-sex college within the University, and it had been originally mooted in the 1970s that it should go mixed. The Middle Common Room, which consisted of postgraduate students, went mixed in the early 1990s, and by the early twenty-first century had elected its first male MCR President (John Newton held the post from 2000-2001). St Mary's was the last of Durham's colleges to become entirely mixed when it took in both males and females at undergraduate level in 2005, ending over a hundred years of tradition.  During the decision-making process the student body was split. Some members of the College felt so strongly against the proposed plans in 2000 that they protested, marching on the University Offices at Old Shire Hall. There had been several polls of the student body over the issue of the College going mixed, and from 1999 onwards these were held almost annually. The results tended to be close, but marginally in favour of retaining the status quo.

The transition to a mixed college took place in 2005, and the first male JCR President, James Liddell, was elected in 2009. The college still provides single-sex accommodation for both sexes as and when required.  The recently refurbished Shepherd wing of the Fergusson building is a segregated women's-only area for students who, for personal, religious or other reasons, would prefer single sex accommodation.  A refurbishment of the Williamson building took place between July and December 2007.

Facilities and traditions

The College is centred on two main buildings: the Fergusson and Williamson Buildings. The Fergusson building, designed by Vincent Harris, was built in the early 1950s and houses most of the College facilities, including the college's dining hall, two computer rooms, the College library, the Chapel, a laundry, two student common rooms and three music rooms. The Chapel is located on the top floor of the North East wing and was designed by the ecclesiastical architect George Pace.  In addition to interiors and furniture produced by Thompson of Kilburn (the Mouseman), it now houses a sculpture of the Blessed Virgin Mary by acclaimed sculptor Fenwick Lawson, which was commissioned in 2005 by the College.The basement location of the Chapel prior to the 1960s now houses the JCR Bar which is managed by a Student Sabbatical Bars Steward. Opposite the Bar entrance is the Toastie Bar.  At the other end of the basement is the JCR Shop which stocks sweets and snacks as well as toiletries, college clothing and some memorabilia.

The Williamson building was built in the early 1960s and is mainly an accommodation block with 110 study bedrooms.  On the ground floor there is a student common room and one half of the lower ground floor contains the JCR fitness room and a laundry.

In the 1990s three ensuite blocks were built on to the front of the Williamson building and are the only ensuite rooms in the college, with the exception of a few located in the Shepherd Wing.  These are mainly filled by 2nd, 3rd or 4th year students who move back into college accommodation, but some are made available to students from any year group who require an ensuite room for medical or personal reasons.

In 2015, principal Simon Hackett opened the new Boughton Wing in Williamson building which was established to maintain this provision and provide women-only accommodation to those who require it.

Student life

The majority of students located on site are first years, who are required to 'live in'.  These students change rooms each term using a 'room ballot' system to ensure that no-one has to share a room for more than one term of their first year.  2nd, 3rd and 4th year students often choose to 'live out' in houses around Durham, although accommodation is available on-site for those who want it. The room ballot ceased to operate at the start of the 2015-2016 academic year and those who lived in kept their rooms for the whole academic year. All those who live on site are fully catered, except in exceptional circumstances.

The College requires the wearing of gowns at formal dinners, which are held between two and three times a term and on the first and last Sunday of each term. Further to this the College requires gowns to be worn at JCR meetings and Matriculation.

Large student led events are held throughout the year, notable highlights include Masquerade Ball, Midsummer Ball and Mary's Day. The College also has its own boat club, St Mary's College Boat Club, which welcomes any members of the college to join in and participate.

College shield and arms
The college arms are blazoned as "Argent a Cross Formy Quadrate Gules a Chief Azure thereon a Durham Mitre Or between two Lilies proper."

The college's motto is "Ancilla Domini" and can be translated to "Handmaiden of the Lord."

Gallery

List of Principals
 1899 Laura Roberts
 1900 Elizabeth Robinson
 1913 Phyllis Wragge
 1915 Rachel E D Donaldson
 1940 Margaret B Fergusson
 1955 Dame Elsie Marjorie Williamson
 1962 Mary Holdsworth
 1974  Florence I Prowse (née Calvert)
 1977 Joan M Kenworthy
 1999 Jenifer L Hobbs
 2007 Phil Gilmartin
 2011 Simon Hackett
 2019 Maggi Dawn
 2022 Adrian Simpson

Notable alumni

Jamie Atkinson - Hong Kong Cricket Captain
Biddy Baxter - Children's TV presenter/radio host
Holly Colvin - England International Cricketer
Julia Copus - Poet and biographer
Jane Griffiths - politician
Katharine Gun - GCHQ translator and whistleblower
Tracy Langlands -  bronze medallist (World Championships) rower
Jenny Willott - politician

References

 Boyd, Elizabeth B. (1999) St. Mary's College, University of Durham, 1899–1999: A Centenary Review. Durham: St. Mary's College.
 Hird, Marilyn, ed. (1974) St. Mary's College, 1899–1974: An Account of the Women's Hostel 1899–1920 and Some Impressions of Later College Life. Durham: St. Mary's College Society.
 Hird, Marilyn, ed. (1982) Doves & Dons: A History of St. Mary's College, Durham. An Account of the Women's Hostel 1899–1920 and Some Impressions of Later College Life. Durham: St. Mary's College.

External links
 St Mary's College
 St Mary's College JCR student organisation
 St Mary's College Middle Common Room
 St Mary's College Boat Club
 St Mary's College Society Alumni Association

Colleges of Durham University
Educational institutions established in 1899
Former women's universities and colleges in the United Kingdom
1899 establishments in England